Cardigan Island is an uninhabited island north of Cardigan, Ceredigion, south-west Wales.

Lying in the estuary of the River Teifi, it is known for having a small colony of grey seals. It is within  of the Welsh coastline near Gwbert. It is owned and managed by the Wildlife Trust of South and West Wales.

The island was once the home of puffins and Manx shearwater. A guide book in the 1890s referred to the puffins as “Welsh parrots”. In 1924 Welsh writer and naturalist Ronald Lockley wrote that there were probably 25 to 30 pairs on the island.  However, in 1934 the liner Herefordshire, being towed to the breakers' yard, ran aground on the island in a storm, and rats made it ashore. Over a period of years they ate the eggs and chicks of nesting seabirds, and wiped out the island’s population of puffin and Manx shearwater, which have never returned. The wreck has attracted a wide variety of marine life and is a diving attraction. It was 45 years before the rat population was exterminated.

Today, birds such as guillemots, razorbills, cormorants, shags, fulmars and a variety of sea-gulls all nest on the island. Bottlenose dolphins and Atlantic grey seals are also often seen in the sea around the island.

See also
 Cardigan Bay

References

External links
Visit-Cardigan.co.uk - Cardigan Island 
www.geograph.co.uk — photographs of Cardigan Island

Islands of Ceredigion
Uninhabited islands of Wales